Herman Cohen was an American film producer.

Herman or Hermann Cohen may also refer to:

 Herman Jay Cohen (born 1932), diplomat
 Hermann Cohen (1842–1918), German-Jewish philosopher
 Hermann Cohen (Carmelite) (1820–1871), Jewish pianist and Carmelite priest